Yakov Yakovlevich Etinger  (August 12, 1929 – August 5, 2014) was a Russian political scientist,  essayist, historian and political activist.

Biography
Etinger was born as  Yakov Lazarevich Siterman in Minsk to Lazar and Vera Sitermans, who perished in the Holocaust. The boy was saved by his nanny Marina Kharetskaya (who was named a Righteous Among the Nations in 1997). He was adopted by the physician Yakov Gilyarievich Etinger and took his family name and patronymic.

During the Doctors' Plot affair, his foster parents were arrested and his father died in prison. Yakov was also arrested in 1950 and sentenced to 10 years in a gulag labor camp as the result of a false accusation of anti-Sovietism. He was exonerated in 1954. He died at the age of 84 on August 6, 2014.

Scholarly activity
From 1956 to 1989 he worked in the Institute of World Economy and International Relations, starting as librarian and ending as principal research fellow, becoming one of the leading Soviet scholars of African studies.

Political activity
In 1988 he was the member of the organizing committee of the Memorial Society.

Literary work
In the 1990s Yakov Etinger published many works about Stalinism, Soviet political repressions and antisemitism in the Soviet Union, both in Russia and abroad.

References

External links
 
 The fate of two Etingers
 Yakov Etinger

1929 births
2014 deaths
Writers from Minsk
Belarusian Jews
Russian sociologists
20th-century Russian historians
Russian political scientists
Moscow State University alumni
Academic staff of Moscow State University